Tyumen Higher Military Engineer Command School named after marshal of engineering troops A.I. Proshlyakov is Russian higher military school conducting warrant officer programmes and commissioned officer programmes (specialitet). It is located in Tyumen.

History
The Academy was founded in 1940 as Tallinn Military Infantry School. In 1941, it was relocated to Tyumen. In 1957, the school changed its specialization and became Tyumen Military Engineering School. In 1968, it was renamed the Tyumen Higher Military Engineer Command School. In 1974, it was given the name of marshal of engineering troops A.I. Proshlyakov.

Educational programmes
The School prepares officers for the engineering troops of the Ground Forces.

Alumni
 Vladimir Puchkov
 Nikolai Serdtsev

References

External links
 Official website

Military high schools